Guy Rochon Owen (August 22, 1913 – April 21, 1952) was a Canadian figure skating champion. 

Owen initially competed in the men's individual figure skating event, winning the 1929 Canadian junior men's singles championship. He went on to specialize in the "Fours Event" with great success. For five straight years between 1933 and 1937, Owen and his skating partners Margaret Davis, Prudence Holbrook, and Melville Rogers won the Fours Event at the Canadian National Figure Skating Championships plus they also captured the bi-annual North American Figure Skating Championship three successive times in 1933, 1935, and 1937.

In 1938 Guy Owen married Maribel Vinson, nine-time United States ladies figure skating champion, and settled in Berkeley, California. They had two daughters, Maribel Owen (1940–1961) and Laurence Owen (1944–1961).

Guy and Maribel Owen turned professional, earning a living as performers with ice skating shows such as the International Ice Skate Revue before setting up their own show. They divorced in 1949 and she and the daughters moved back east to the Boston area in 1952, where they lived with her recently widowed mother in Winchester.

During his final year, Owen worked in Spokane, Washington. While visiting his parents in Ottawa, Owen died at age 38 of a perforated ulcer on April 21, 1952. His ex-wife and daughters died nine years later in the Sabena 548 plane crash in Belgium, which killed the U.S. figure skating team in February 1961.

Results

Men's singles

Fours
(with Margaret Davis, Prudence Holbrook, and Melville Rogers)

(with Frances Claudet, Kathleen Lopdell, and Melville Rogers)

See also
Maribel Vinson
Maribel Owen
Laurence Owen

References

External links

Canadian male single skaters
1913 births
1952 deaths
20th-century Canadian people